Lohrbach may refer to:

 Lohrbach (Aubach), a river of Bavaria, Germany
 Lohrbach (Kyll), a river of Rhineland-Palatinate, Germany 
 Lohrbach (Lohr), a river of Hesse, Germany